Honoré Chevrier (1904 – December 26, 1983) was a Canadian boxer who competed in the 1928 Summer Olympics. He was born in Embrun, Ontario. In 1928 he was eliminated in the second round of the middleweight class after losing his fight to Oscar Kjällander.

References

Honoré Chevrier's profile at Sports Reference.com

1904 births
1983 deaths
Middleweight boxers
Olympic boxers of Canada
Boxers at the 1928 Summer Olympics
People from Russell, Ontario
Franco-Ontarian people
Boxing people from Ontario
Canadian male boxers